The 2000 Croatian Bol Ladies Open was a women's tennis tournament played on outdoor clay courts in Bol, Croatia that was part of the Tier III category of the 2000 WTA Tour. It was the seventh edition of the tournament and was held from 1 May until 7 May 2000. Unseeded Tina Pisnik won the singles title and earned $27,000 first-prize money.

Finals

Singles
 Tina Pisnik defeated  Amélie Mauresmo 7–6(7–4), 7–6(7–2)
 It was Pisnik's only singles title of her career.

Doubles
 Julie Halard-Decugis /  Corina Morariu defeated  Tina Križan /  Katarina Srebotnik 6–2, 6–2

See also
 2000 Croatia Open

External links
 ITF tournament edition details
 Tournament draws

Croatian Bol Ladies Open
Croatian Bol Ladies Open
2000 in Croatian tennis
2000 in Croatian women's sport